The Europe/Africa Zone was one of the three zones of the regional Davis Cup competition in 1998.

In the Europe/Africa Zone there were four different tiers, called groups, in which teams competed against each other to advance to the upper tier.

Group I

Winners in Group I advanced to the World Group Qualifying Round, along with losing teams from the World Group first round. Teams who lost in the first round competed in the relegation play-offs, with winning teams remaining in Group I, whereas teams who lost their play-offs were relegated to the Europe/Africa Zone Group II in 1999.

Participating nations

Group II

Winners in Group II advanced to the Europe/Africa Zone Group I. Teams who lost their respective ties competed in the relegation play-offs, with winning teams remaining in Group II, whereas teams who lost their play-offs were relegated to the Europe/Africa Zone Group III in 1999.

Participating nations

Group III
The top two teams in each Group III sub-zone advanced to the Europe/Africa Zone Group II in 1999, whereas the bottom two teams in each sub-zone were relegated to the Europe/Africa Zone Group IV in 1999.

Participating nations

Zone A

Draw

Final standings

Zone B

Draw

Final standings

Group IV
The top two teams in each Group IV sub-zone advanced to the Europe/Africa Zone Group III in 1999. All other teams remained in Group IV.

Participating nations

Zone A

Draw

Final standings

Zone B

Draw

References

External links
Davis Cup official website

Davis Cup Europe/Africa Zone
Europe Africa Zone